Madulce Peak is a mountain located in the San Rafael Mountains, in the Transverse Ranges. It is the highest point of the Dick Smith Wilderness. The summit contains an old fire lookout that was constructed in the 1930s, but was burned down in the 1970s.

Name
The mountain was originally named Strawberry Peak by surveyors. Over the years, the name "Madulce" was gradually adopted. The Board on Geographic Names originally believed that "madulce" was the Spanish word for "strawberry". Etymological work done by the United States Forest Service ascertained that the word is actually local farmhand slang for "strawberry", from the Catalan word "maduixa".

References

Mountains of Santa Barbara County, California
San Rafael Mountains
Los Padres National Forest
Mountains of Southern California